is a passenger railway station in located in the city of Miyazu, Kyoto Prefecture, Japan, operated by the private railway company Willer Trains (Kyoto Tango Railway).

Lines
Miyazu Station is the terminus station for all three lines of the Kyoto Tango Railway.

Station layout
The station consists of two ground-level island platforms connected by a footbridge. The station is staffed.

Adjacent stations

History
The station was opened on 12 April 1924.

Passenger statistics
In fiscal 2019, the station was used by an average of 462 passengers daily.

Surrounding area
 Miyazu City Hall
 Miyazu History Museum

See also
List of railway stations in Japan

References

External links

Official home page 

Railway stations in Kyoto Prefecture
Railway stations in Japan opened in 1924
Miyazu, Kyoto